Charles M. Brunner (born April 15, 1952) is a Democratic politician from Michigan currently serving in the Michigan House of Representatives. He is a former mayor of Bay City.

Prior to his time in elected office, Brunner was a teacher for 30 years. Once mayor, he was a founding member of what was once known as the Mayors Automotive Coalition, now the Manufacturing Alliance of Communities, and started several other city initiatives including a community clean-up and an adopt-a-park program.

Formerly a musician, Brunner played with the rock group Question Mark and the Mysterians.

References

Living people
Mayors of places in Michigan
Democratic Party members of the Michigan House of Representatives
1952 births
21st-century American politicians